Lake Mattoon is a  reservoir located in Coles County, Illinois, Cumberland County, Illinois, and Shelby County, Illinois. Almost three-quarters of the lake, is located in Shelby County. The reservoir was built to supply  tap water to Mattoon, Illinois and Neoga, but also provides fishing and boating recreation.

The lake is owned by the city of Mattoon. Boaters must buy a permit to use the lake. There is no power limit on the lake, which welcomes waterskiers. The lake is stocked with bass, bluegill, catfish, and crappie. The nearest Interstate access is Exit 177 on Interstate 57.

A large Reliant Energy electricity generating plant stands adjacent to the lake.

References

Protected areas of Coles County, Illinois
Protected areas of Cumberland County, Illinois
Mattoon
Protected areas of Shelby County, Illinois
Bodies of water of Coles County, Illinois
Bodies of water of Cumberland County, Illinois
Bodies of water of Shelby County, Illinois